During the 2003–04 season, Middlesbrough participated in the FA Premier League.

Team kit and sponsors
Middlesbrough were sponsored by Dial-a-Phone, the team's kit was produced by Errea. The home shirt consisted of a plain red shirt, red shorts and red socks with white trim. The away strip was mainly navy blue with maroon shoulders, navy shorts and navy socks, with maroon detailing.

Season review

League review
Middlesbrough had an appalling start to their season, losing four of their first five games (their worst start since the 1984–85 season) and taking only one point. This set the foundations for a very patchy season.

Middlesbrough hovered around the relegation spots for the first third of the season. However, they eventually found some form through November and December and went unbeaten for eight games which took them away from the relegation zone.

Middlesbrough's form was again inconsistent after Christmas, but they managed to pick up enough points to finish in a respectable 11th place.

Domestic cup review
The league cup campaign was the highlight of the season for Middlesbrough. It was one that would bring them their first major trophy in their 128-year history.

It started in late September with a home match against Brighton and Hove Albion and Boro low down in the league due to a terrible start. Middlesbrough made hard work of it against lower league opposition, but managed to scrape through with a 94th minute extra-time goal from Malcolm Christie.

The next round saw Boro comfortably beat Wigan Athletic 2–1 away with goals from Maccarone and Mendieta to set up a fourth round home match against Everton.

The match against Everton was a closely contested affair, which ended 0–0 after extra time - penalties were needed to decide the winner. Middlesbrough won the shoot-out 5–4, with Mark Schwarzer saving from Leon Osman and Mendieta converting the winning penalty.

The quarter finals saw Middlesbrough face Tottenham Hotspur at White Hart Lane. Spurs led most of the match through a first-minute Darren Anderton goal. It took an 86th-minute equaliser from Michael Ricketts to send the game into extra time. No goals were scored in extra time, meaning Boro had a penalty shoot out for the second successive round. The shoot out went into sudden death, but after Mauricio Taricco's penalty hit the post, Franck Queudrue converted his penalty to win the game.

Boro's semi final was a two legged match against a youthful Arsenal team. The first leg went Middlesbrough's way with them taking a 1–0 lead thanks to a Juninho goal. Arsenal boss Arsène Wenger chose a few more experienced players for the vital second leg, but to no avail: Boro won 2–1 on the night for a 3–1 aggregate win.

The final was on 29 February 2004 against Bolton Wanderers at the Millennium Stadium. The game started in the best way possible for Boro, with goals from Joseph Desire-Job and Bolo Zenden giving them an early 2–0 lead. A mistake from Mark Schwarzer let Kevin Davies get one back, and the score remained 2–1 at half time. Both teams had chances to score in the second half, but the score stayed the same, giving Boro their first ever major trophy.

The FA Cup campaign wasn't as successful. After a comfortable 2–0 win at home to Notts County, Boro were drawn against Arsenal in the fourth round. They lost the match 4–1 sending them out of the competition.

Final league table

Squad

Senior squad

Left club during season

Transfers

In

Out

Premier League results

Note: Results are given with Middlesbrough score listed first. Man of the Match is according to mfc.co.uk.

Cup results

League Cup

FA Cup

Player statistics

Goalscorers
Goalscoring statistics for 2003-04.

Appearances / Discipline
Appearance and disciplinary records for 2003-04 league and cup matches.

Starting 11
Considering starts in all competitions
Considering a 4-4-2 formation
 GK: #1,  Mark Schwarzer, 44
 RB: #15,  Danny Mills, 37
 CB: #6,  Gareth Southgate, 34
 CB: #4,  Ugo Ehiogu, 19
 LB: #3,  Franck Queudrue, 40
 RM: #14,  Gaizka Mendieta, 37
 CM: #7,  George Boateng, 43
 CM: #10,  Juninho, 31
 LM: #27,  Boudewijn Zenden, 38
 CF: #9,  Massimo Maccarone, 18
 CF: #16,  Joseph-Desire Job, 22

Notes

References and notes

Middlesbrough F.C. seasons
Middlesbrough